The 2019–20 Arkansas–Pine Bluff Golden Lions men's basketball team represented the University of Arkansas at Pine Bluff in the 2019–20 NCAA Division I men's basketball season. The Golden Lions, led by 12th-year head coach George Ivory, played their home games at the K. L. Johnson Complex in Pine Bluff, Arkansas as members of the Southwestern Athletic Conference. They finished the season 4–26, 3–15 in SWAC play to finish in a tie for ninth place. They failed to qualify for the SWAC tournament.

Previous season
The Golden Lions finished the 2018–19 season 13–19 overall, 10–8 in SWAC play, to finish in a three-way tie for 3rd place. In the SWAC tournament, they were defeated by Grambling State in the quarterfinals.

Roster

Schedule and results

|-
!colspan=12 style=| Non-conference regular season

|-
!colspan=9 style=| SWAC regular season

Source

References

Arkansas–Pine Bluff Golden Lions men's basketball seasons
Arkansas-Pine Bluff Golden Lions
Arkansas-Pine Bluff Golden Lions men's basketball
Arkansas-Pine Bluff Golden Lions men's basketball